The 1998 Ukrainian Cup Final is a football match that took place at the NSC Olimpiyskiy on May 31, 1998. The match was the 7th Ukrainian Cup Final and it was contested by both Kyivan clubs FC Dynamo Kyiv and FC CSKA Kyiv. The 1998 Ukrainian Cup Final was the seventh to be held in the Ukrainian capital Kyiv. Dynamo won by two goals netted by Andriy Shevchenko on the 1st and 33rd minutes. CSKA managed to answer with a single tally from Novokhatsky on the 68th minute, which was scored on the rebound right after the missed penalty kick. Shovkovskyi managed to deflect the penalty kick from Oliynyk.

There also were several yellow cards issued at this game, all of them to Army players: Semchuk, Hohil, and Kripak.

Road to Kyiv 

Both teams started from the first round of the competition (1/16). Dynamo did not have any difficulties along the way meeting almost no resistance from every team. Especially surprising was the face-off with Chornomorets Odessa which ended with an unbelievable 4-1 win for the white-blues in Odessa. CSKA impressed when it easily defeated Dnipro Dnipropetrovsk in the away game.

Match details

Match statistics

See also
 Ukrainian Cup 1997-98

References

External links 
 Calendar of Matches - Schedule of the 1997-98 Ukrainian Cup on the Ukrainian Soccer History web-site (ukrsoccerhistory.com). 

Cup Final
Ukrainian Cup finals
Ukrainian Cup Final 1998
Ukrainian Cup Final 1998
Sports competitions in Kyiv